Adjuvilo is a constructed language created in 1910 by Claudius Colas under the pseudonym of "Profesoro V. Esperema". Although it was a full language, it may not have been created to be spoken. Many believe that as an Esperantist, Colas created Adjuvilo to help create dissent in the then-growing Ido movement. Colas himself called his language simplified Ido and proposed several reforms to Ido.

Colas created a nearly complete grammar, but did not create a new vocabulary. Adjuvilo uses mainly the vocabulary of Ido with modifications according to the grammatical changes of Ido. Colas in some cases reestablishes the Esperanto forms of words and even constructed some new words like sulo for "sun" (Ido/Esperanto: suno) and dago for "day" (Ido: dio, Esperanto: tago).

Phonology and orthography
Like Ido, Adjuvilo has five vowel phonemes. The combinations /au/ and /eu/ become diphthongs in word roots but not when adding affixes.

Adjuvilo also uses the same orthography as Ido: the 26 letters as the English alphabet and ISO Basic Latin alphabet with three digraphs and no ligatures or diacritics. The only modification is that the stress is always on the penultimate syllable like in Esperanto, whereas in Ido in the infinitive of the verbs the last syllable is stressed.

The digraphs are:

Grammar
 The definite article for all genders is in the singular la and in the plural las but the form la can be valid for the plural.  You may elide the final a of the article, replacing it with an apostrophe, as equally before a consonant as before a vowel. Example: l'artiklo, l'profesoro.
 All nouns end in the singular in -o and in the plural in -s. Example: la lando (the land) and las landos (the lands). Like Ido and Esperanto, Adjuvilo has no indefinite article
 Adjuvilo does not have grammatical genders. Nouns for females are all derived from the masculine form by using the affix -in. Example: filio (son) and filiino (daughter).
 The genitive and the indirect object cases are expressed by prepositions. Example: Me donin la libro de la patro a mea filio (I gave my father's book to my son).
 The adjective ends on -a, and also receives -s in the plural. It is placed before the noun. Example: un bona viro (a good man), belas juvenilos (beautiful girls), granda monto (a big mountain).
The positive form is indicated by tam (as). Example: Vos estan tam bonas quam nos. (You are as good as us).
The comparative form is indicated by plu (more) and men (less). Example: El estan plu bela quam il. (She is more beautiful than he). Tia libro estan men interesanta quam cia. (That book is less interesting than this [one]).
The superlative form is indicated by la pley (most) and la min (least). Example: Adjuvilo estan la pley facila linguo ex omnas linguos. (Adjuvilo is the easiest language of all languages). Hike estan la min bela urbo de omnas. (Here is the least beautiful city of all).

 The adverb is formed from the adjective form by replacing the ending -a by -e. Adverbs are not changed in the plural. Example: Elas kantan bone. (They sing well).
 The personal pronouns are
Singular me (I), tu / vu (you), il (he), el (she), it (it), lo (third person gender not defined). Vu indicates respect.
Plural nos (we), vos (you), ilos (they, masculine), elos (they, female), itos (they, neuter), los (they, unspecified gender)
Additional personal pronouns: on (one, impersonal form), su (reflexive form)
 The possessive pronouns are formed by adding the adjective ending -a and in the plural the -s to the personal pronouns: mea (my), tua (your), ila (his), nosas (our), ilosas (their, masculine). The reflexive possessive pronoun sua (his/her/its) in the singular and suas in the plural is only used for the third person and can be only used when it refers to the subject of the sentence.
 The demonstrative pronouns are cia (this) and tia (that). Like other pronouns they also have plural forms. Cias floros estan bela ma tias arboros estan plu grandas (These flowers are beautiful but these trees are bigger.)
 The relative pronouns are qua, quas (subject - who/which/that) and que (complement/accusative). 
 The interrogative pronouns include qua (who), quo (what), quale (how), quare (why).
 The coordinating conjunctions include e (and), o (or); adding a d before words that begin with a vowel.
 Tag questions are formed with the particle num. Num il parolan Adjuvilo? (Does he speak Adjuvilo?).
 Verbs are not conjugated according to singular/plural or person.
The infinitive ending is -i like in Esperanto: diri (to say), lerni (to learn).
The present tense is formed by replacing the infinitive ending by -an. Example: Me kantan (I sing), tu kantan (you sing).
The past tense is formed by -in. Example: Me vidin (I saw).
The future tense is formed by -on. Example: Me vidon (I will see).
The conjunctive is formed by adding -un. Example: Me vidun (I would see).
The imperative is formed by adding -en. Example: Lekten la libro! (Read the book!)
The active participles are formed with the suffix -ant for the present tense, -int for the past tense and -ont for the future tense. Example: vidinta (having seen), vidanta (seeing), vidonta (about to see). These can be used in the progressive and other compound tenses: Me estin vidinta (I had seen). Me estin vidanta (I was seeing). Me estin vidonta (I was about to see). Me estan vidinta (I have seen). Me estan vidanta (I am seeing). Me estan vidonta (I am about to see). Me eston vidinta (I shall have seen). Me eston vidanta (I shall be seeing). Me eston vidonta (I shall be about to see). Me estun vidinta (I would have seen). Me estun vidanta (I would be seeing). Me estun vidonta (I would be about to see).
The passive participles are formed with the suffix -at for the present tense, -it for the past tense and -ot for the future tense. Example: vidita (having been seen), vidata (being seen), vidota (about to be seen). These can be used in the passive and other compound tenses: Me estin vidita (I had been seen). Me estin vidata (I was being seen). Me estin vidota (I was about to be seen). Me estan vidita (I have been seen). Me estan vidata (I am being seen). Me estan vidota (I am about to be seen). Me eston vidita (I shall have been seen). Me eston vidata (I shall be being seen). Me eston vidota (I shall be about to be seen). Me estun vidita (I would have been seen). Me estun vidata (I would be being seen). Me estun vidota (I would be about to be seen).

 The cardinal numbers are: 1 — un, 2 — du, 3 — tri, 4 — quar, 5 — quin, 6 — sis, 7 — sep, 8 — ok, 9 — nov, 10 — dek, 100 — cent, 1000 — mil, 1000000 — milion. The ordinal numbers are formed with the suffix -esma: unesma, duesma, triesma.

Comparison to Ido
 Adjuvilo completely eliminates a special ending for the accusative case, whereas in Ido it was still used in sentences beginning with the object.
 Adjuvilo uses the plural ending also for adjectives, the definite article and all pronouns.
 Adjuvilo uses as plural ending -s and not -i as Ido.
 Adjuvilo replaces the Ido infinitive ending -ar by the Esperanto form -i. The infinitive forms of the different tenses in Ido were completely abolished.
 Adjuvilo completely abolishes the synthetic passive voice form of the verbs by a compound form of the auxiliary verb "to be" and the corresponding participle.
 Adjuvilo changes the Ido system of affixes by creating new affixes, omitting some and modifying some existing ones.
 Adjuvilo changes many pronouns of Ido.
 The accent in Adjuvilo is always on the penultimate syllable, as in Esperanto.
 Colas also announced changes to the vocabulary without elaborating this completely. Example: ucelo → avio (bird), hano → galo (chicken), hanino → galino (hen), dio → dago (day), deo → dio (god), kelka → alguna (some), ceno → sceno (scene), kam → quam (than), kin → quin (five), non → nov (nine), kande → quande (when), pro quo → quare (why), kad → num (interrogative particle), di → de (of), suno → sulo (sun), ol → it / lo

Sample
A sample of Adjuvilo, the often-translated Pater Noster:

Bibliography
 Claudius Colas, L'Adjuvilo. Paris, Gamber, 1910. 32+ pp.
 Mario Pei, One Language for the World and How To Achieve It. Devin-Adair, New York, 1958. xvi + 291 pp.

References

External links
 Claudius Colas (1884-1914), la kunfondinto de IKUE (in Esperanto)

Esperantido
Ido language
International auxiliary languages
Constructed languages
Constructed languages introduced in the 1910s